is the name of multiple Buddhist temples in Japan:

, in Aizuwakamatsu, Fukushima Prefecture
Dairyū-ji (Gifu) in Gifu, Gifu Prefecture
, in Kobe, Hyōgo Prefecture
, in Higashiōsaka, Osaka Prefecture

See also
 Tairyūji, in Anan, Tokushima Prefecture